The Adventures of Superpup, a 1958 unaired pilot, was meant to capitalize on the success of Adventures of Superman. Superpup featured the first television portrayal of the Superman characters as humanoid animals.

Overview
Television producer Whitney Ellsworth created a pilot that placed the Superman mythos into a fictional universe populated by dogs instead of human beings. The live-action actors were placed in dog suits to portray the canine versions of the Superman characters. The pilot was filmed on the same set as The Adventures of Superman, and people with dwarfism portrayed the characters. Whitney Ellsworth later produced The Adventures of Superboy television pilot.

The Clark Kent character was renamed "Bark Bent". Bark Bent worked for the Daily Bugle (not to be confused with the Daily Bugle in comics featuring Spider-Man) under editor "Terry Bite". His co-worker was reporter "Pamela Poodle". Superpup/Bark Bent was played by actor Billy Curtis, who was also in Superman and the Mole Men with George Reeves.

In the pilot, Pamela Poodle is the victim of the evil Professor Sheepdip, who has tied her to a rocket that will be launched into space. Superpup must save her.

Cast
 Billy Curtis as Bark Bent / Superpup
 Ruth Delfino as Pamela Poodle
 Angelo Rossitto as Terry Bite
 Frank Delfino as Sergeant Beagle
 Harry Monty as Professor Sheepdip
 Sadie Delfino as Sheepdip's dupe

Other media
A book titled Superboy and Superpup: The Lost Videos, written by Chuck Harter, was published in 1993 by Cult Movies Press. Employees had seen the obscure pilots for both of the proposed replacements for the Reeves series, as well as twelve unproduced Superboy scripts. Both were released unofficially to the public domain on the VHS format. It is also available as part of Warner Home Video's fourteen-disc DVD set, Superman Ultimate Collector's Edition. Half of the episode is presented in the collection in color from a surviving print, while the other half of the pilot is presented in black & white from a video master of lesser quality. In September 2022, BearManorMedia.com republished "Superboy & Superpup The Lost Videos" by Chuck Harter, now with a full color front cover. The new edition is available in hardback, paperback and e-book editions.

References

External links 

Superman on TV Adventures of Superpup trailer
Superpup Video Rarities
The New Adventures of Superpup Superman Supersite

1958 American television episodes
Black-and-white American television shows
English-language television shows
Superman television series
Television pilots not picked up as a series
Unaired television pilots